Juan Felipe Toruño (León, Nicaragua, 1 May 1898 - San Salvador, El Salvador, 31 August 1980) was a Nicaraguan writer. El silencio  (1935) was awarded the prize in Concurso del Libro Americano, Matanzas, Cuba,  1938. The story Chupasangre  (1945) won Premio Internacional "Alfonso Hernández Catá" de Cuento in La Habana, Cuba.

References

1898 births
1980 deaths